Amphicrossa is a genus of moths in the family Geometridae.

Species
 Amphicrossa adelosticha (Turner, 1926)
 Amphicrossa hemadelpha (Lower, 1897)

References
 Amphicrossa at Markku Savela's Lepidoptera and some other life forms

Nacophorini
Geometridae genera